The Glass Cafe (The full title The Glass Cafe Or the Stripper and the State; How My Mother Started a War with the System That Made Us Kind of Rich and a Little Bit Famous), is a young adult fiction novella by Gary Paulsen. It is about a twelve-year-old boy whose mother is a stripper.

Plot introduction
Tony is fascinated with art, and goes to the club that his mom works at to draw pictures of some of the ladies. When his art teacher looks at the drawings, she wants to put them up in a museum for a contest.
When people look at the pictures of the ladies Tony's mom gets in trouble and is sent to court for letting her son draw pornographic pictures.  Tony's mom explains that it was just art, and tells them the story of the Glass Cafe.

Publication history
2003, USA, Wendy Lamb Books , Pub date June 10, 2003, Hardback
2004, USA, Laurel Leaf, Pub date November 9, 2004, Paperback

Reception
The GlassCafe was received favourably.  Kirkus Reviews found it "Not too likely, but all good fun, and Paulsen claims that Al is based on an actual acquaintance. Introduce reluctant readers, Paulsen fans, or anyone who enjoys an occasional belly laugh to this prototypical preteen and his most memorable mom."  while Publishers Weekly wrote "In one of his minor efforts, the prolific Paulsen serves up a righteous, pro–free-speech theme accompanied by big helpings of over-the-top plot lines." and "Paulsen looks to the endless run-on sentences and artless grammar of Tony's delivery for humor", concluding " Readers who like this style of writing can rest easy: Paulsen maintains that style all the way to the end."

References

Novels by Gary Paulsen
2003 American novels
American young adult novels
American novellas
Wendy Lamb Books books